Robert Lee Omengan Longid (October 19, 1935– January 20, 1996) was a Filipino Episcopalian bishop. He was bishop of the Diocese of the Northern Philippines in the Episcopal Church in the Philippines from 1986 to 1996. He was consecrated as a suffragan bishop in 1983. He was the son of Bishop Edward G. Longid.

References

External links 
Death of Bishop Robert Longid

1936 births
1996 deaths
Bishops of the Episcopal Church (United States)
Filipino Episcopalians
20th-century American Episcopalians
Anglican bishops in the Philippines
Episcopal bishops of Northern Philippines
20th-century American clergy
Filipino bishops